Bohdan Mykolayovych Samardak (born 25 March 1963) is a Ukrainian professional football coach and a former player.

Samardak after retiring as footballer became a manager in some amateur clubs. After becoming of the assistant coach in Nyva Ternopil, in March 2014 he was appointed as the interim coach for this club in Ukrainian First League.

References

External links
 
 

1963 births
Living people
Sportspeople from Lviv Oblast
Soviet footballers
Ukrainian footballers
Association football forwards
FC Volyn Lutsk players
NK Veres Rivne players
FC Metalurh Zaporizhzhia players
ŠK Futura Humenné players
FC Bukovyna Chernivtsi players
FC Nyva Ternopil players
FC Polissya Zhytomyr players
Soviet First League players
Soviet Second League players
Soviet Second League B players
Slovak National Football League players
Ukrainian Premier League players
Ukrainian First League players
Ukrainian Amateur Football Championship players
Soviet expatriate footballers
Expatriate footballers in Czechoslovakia
Soviet expatriate sportspeople in Czechoslovakia
Ukrainian expatriate footballers
Ukrainian expatriate sportspeople in Czechoslovakia
Expatriate footballers in Slovakia
Ukrainian expatriate sportspeople in Slovakia
Ukrainian football managers
FC Nyva Ternopil managers
Ukrainian First League managers